This article serves as an index - as complete as possible - of all the honorific orders or similar decorations received by the Dutch Royal Family, classified by continent, awarding country and recipient.

Dutch honours
 King Willem-Alexander: 
 Grand Master of the Military William Order
 Grand Master and Knight Grand Cross of the Order of the Netherlands Lion
 Grand Master of the Order of Orange-Nassau
 Co-Grand Master and Knight of the Order of the Gold Lion of the House of Nassau
 Grand Master and Grand Cross of the Order of the House of Orange
 Grand Master of the Order of the Crown
 Grand Master of the Decoration for Loyalty and Merit
 Grand Master of the Order of the Golden Ark
 Honorary Commander of the Order of Saint John in the Netherlands
 Recipient of the Eleven Cities Cross
 Recipient of the 
 Recipient of the Queen Beatrix Inauguration Medal
 Queen Máxima:
 Knight Grand Cross of the Order of the Netherlands Lion 
 Grand Cross of the Order of the House of Orange
 Recipient of the Wedding Medal of Prince Willem-Alexander, Prince of Orange and Máxima Zorreguieta
 Recipient of the King Willem-Alexander Inauguration Medal
 Princess Beatrix:
 Former Grand Master of the Military William Order
 Former Grand Master and Knight Grand Cross of the Order of the Netherlands Lion
 Former Grand Master of the Order of Orange-Nassau
 Former Co-Grand Master of the Order of the Gold Lion of the House of Nassau
 Former Grand Master of the Order of the House of Orange
 Former Grand Master of the Order of the Crown
 Former Grand Master of the Decoration for Loyalty and Merit
 Former Grand Master of the Order of the Golden Ark
 Former Grand Master Knight of the Order of Saint John
 Patron of the Teutonic Order of Bailiwick of Utrecht
 Former Honorary Commander of the Order of Saint John in the Netherlands
 Recipient of the Wedding Medal of Prince Willem-Alexander, Prince of Orange and Maxima Zorruigeta
 Recipient of the King Willem-Alexander Inauguration Medal
 Catharina-Amalia, Princess of Orange:
 Knight Grand Cross of the Order of the Netherlands Lion 
 Knight of the Order of the Gold Lion of the House of Nassau
 Princess Mabel: 
Recipient of the King Willem-Alexander Inauguration Medal
Grand Cross of the Order of the House of Orange
 Prince Constantijn:
 Knight Grand Cross of the Order of the Netherlands Lion
 Knight of the Order of the Gold Lion of the House of Nassau
 Recipient of the Queen Beatrix Inauguration Medal
 Recipient of the Wedding Medal of Prince Willem-Alexander, Prince of Orange and Máxima Zorreguieta
 Recipient of the King Willem-Alexander Inauguration Medal
 Princess Laurentien:
 Grand Cross of the Order of the House of Orange
 Recipient of the Wedding Medal of Prince Willem-Alexander, Prince of Orange and Máxima Zorreguieta
 Recipient of the King Willem-Alexander Inauguration Medal
 Princess Irene:
 Knight Grand Cross of the Order of the Netherlands Lion
 Recipient of the Silver Wedding Anniversary Medal of Queen Juliana and Prince Bernhard
 Recipient of the Wedding Medal of Princess Beatrix, Princess of Orange and Claus Van Amsberg
 Recipient of the Queen Beatrix Inauguration Medal
 Recipient of the Wedding Medal of Prince Willem-Alexander, Prince of Orange and Máxima Zorreguieta
 Recipient of the King Willem-Alexander Inauguration Medal
 Princess Margriet:
 Knight Grand Cross of the Order of the Netherlands Lion
 Recipient of the Silver Wedding Anniversary Medal of Queen Juliana and Prince Bernhard
 Recipient of the Wedding Medal of Princess Beatrix, Princess of Orange and Claus Van Amsberg
 Recipient of the Queen Beatrix Inauguration Medal
 Recipient of the Wedding Medal of Prince Willem-Alexander, Prince of Orange and Máxima Zorreguieta
 Recipient of the King Willem-Alexander Inauguration Medal
 Pieter van Vollenhoven:
 Knight Grand Cross of the Order of the Netherlands Lion
 Grand Cross of the Order of the House of Orange
 Recipient of the Queen Beatrix Inauguration Medal
 Recipient of the Wedding Medal of Prince Willem-Alexander, Prince of Orange and Máxima Zorreguieta
 Recipient of the King Willem-Alexander Inauguration Medal

European foreign honours

Austria
 King Willem-Alexander: Grand Star of the Decoration of Honour for Services to the Republic of Austria (2022)
 Queen Maxima:  Grand Star of the Decoration of Honour for Services to the Republic of Austria (2022)
 Princess Beatrix: Grand Star of the Decoration of Honour for Services to the Republic of Austria
 Princess Irene:  Grand Decoration of Honour in Gold with Sash of the Decoration of Honour for Services to the Republic of Austria

Belgium 

 King Willem-Alexander: 
 Grand Cross of the Order of the Crown
Grand Cordon of the Order of Leopold; 2016.
 Queen Maxima: 
 Grand Cross of the Order of the Crown; 2006
 Grand Cordon of the Order of Leopold; 2016.
 Princess Beatrix: Grand Cordon of the Order of Leopold
 Prince Constantijn: Grand Cross of the Order of the Crown
 Princess Laurentien: Grand Cross of the Order of the Crown; 2016.
 Princess Irene: Grand Cordon of the Order of Leopold
 Princess Margriet: Grand Cross of the Order of the Crown
 Pieter van Vollenhoven: Grand Cross of the Order of the Crown

Bulgaria
 Princess Beatrix: Grand Cross of the Order of the Stara Planina

Denmark
 King Willem-Alexander: Knight of the Order of the Elephant (31 January 1998)
 Queen Máxima: Knight of the Order of the Elephant (17 March 2015)
 Princess Beatrix: Knight of the Order of the Elephant (29 October 1975)

Estonia
 King Willem-Alexander: Collar of the Order of the Cross of Terra Mariana (5 June 2018)
 Queen Máxima: Member 1st Class of the Order of the Cross of Terra Mariana (5 June 2018)
 Princess Beatrix: Collar of the Order of the Cross of Terra Mariana (6 May 2008)

Finland

 Princess Beatrix: Grand Cross with Collar of the Order of the White Rose of Finland
 Princess Margriet: Grand Cross of the Order of the White Rose of Finland
 Pieter van Vollenhoven: Grand Cross of the Order of the White Rose of Finland

France

 King Willem-Alexander: 
Grand Cross of the Legion of Honour
Grand Cross of the National Order of Merit
 Queen Máxima: Grand Cross of the National Order of Merit
 Princess Beatrix: Grand Cross of the Legion of Honour
 Princess Margriet: Grand Cross of the National Order of Merit
 Pieter van Vollenhoven: Grand Cross of the National Order of Merit

Germany

 King Willem-Alexander: 
 Grand Cross 1st Class of the Order of Merit of the Federal Republic of Germany
 Grand Cross Special Class of the Order of Merit of the Federal Republic of Germany
 Queen Maxima: 
 Grand Cross 1st Class of the Order of Merit of the Federal Republic of Germany
 Grand Cross Special Class of the Order of Merit of the Federal Republic of Germany
 Princess Beatrix: Grand Cross Special Class of the Order of Merit of the Federal Republic of Germany
 Princess Margriet: Grand Cross 1st Class of the Order of Merit of the Federal Republic of Germany
 Pieter van Vollenhoven: Grand Cross 1st Class of the Order of Merit of the Federal Republic of Germany

Greece
Greek royal family
 Princess Beatrix: Dame Grand Cross of the Order of Saints Olga and Sophia
Greek republic
 King Willem-Alexander: Grand Cross of the Order of the Redeemer (31 October 2022)
 Queen Máxima of the Netherlands: Grand Cross of the Order of the Redeemer (31 October 2022)
 Princess Beatrix: Grand Cross of the Order of the Redeemer

Iceland
 Princess Beatrix: Collar with Grand Cross Breast Star of the Order of the Falcon

Italy
 Willem-Alexander of the Netherlands: Knight Grand Cross with Collar of the Order of Merit of the Italian Republic
 Queen Máxima of the Netherlands: Knight Grand Cross of the Order of Merit of the Italian Republic
 Princess Beatrix: Knight Grand Cross with Collar of the Order of Merit of the Italian Republic
 Princess Margriet: Knight Grand Cross of the Order of Merit of the Italian Republic
 Pieter van Vollenhoven: Knight Grand Cross of the Order of Merit of the Italian Republic

Latvia
 King Willem-Alexander: Commander Grand Cross with Chain of the Order of Three Stars
 Queen Máxima: Commander Grand Cross of the Order of Three Stars
 Princess Beatrix: Commander Grand Cross with Chain of the Order of Three Stars

Lithuania
 King Willem-Alexander: Golden Chain of the Order of Vytautas the Great
 Queen Máxima: Grand Cross of the Order for Merits to Lithuania
 Princess Beatrix: Golden Chain of the Order of Vytautas the Great

Luxembourg
 King Willem-Alexander: 
 Grand Cross of the Order of Adolphe of Nassau
 Grand Cross of the Order of the Oak Crown
 Queen Maxima: 
 Grand Cross of the Order of Adolphe of Nassau
 Knight of the Order of the Gold Lion of the House of Nassau
 Princess Beatrix:
 Knight of the Order of the Gold Lion of the House of Nassau
 Grand Cross of the Order of Adolphe of Nassau
 Grand Cross of the Order of the Oak Crown
 Princess Margriet:
 Grand Cross of the Order of Adolphe of Nassau
 Grand Cross of the Order of the Oak Crown
 Pieter van Vollenhoven: Grand Cross of the Order of Adolphe of Nassau

Malta
 Princess Beatrix: Grand Cross of Honour and Devotion of the Sovereign Military Order of Malta

Norway
 King Willem-Alexander: Grand Cross with Collar of the Order of St. Olav
 Queen Máxima: Grand Cross of the Order of St. Olav 
 Princess Beatrix: Grand Cross with Collar of the Order of St. Olav
 Princess Margriet: Grand Cross of the Order of St. Olav
 Pieter van Vollenhoven: Grand Cross of the Royal Norwegian Order of Merit

Poland

 King Willem-Alexander: Knight of the Order of the White Eagle
 Queen Máxima: Knight of the Order of the White Eagle
 Princess Beatrix: Knight of the Order of the White Eagle
 Pieter van Vollenhoven: Commander's Cross of the Order of Merit of the Republic of Poland (2012)

Portugal
 King Willem-Alexander: Grand Collar of the Order of Prince Henry
 Queen Máxima: Grand Collar of the Order of Prince Henry
 Princess Beatrix: Grand Collar of the Order of Prince Henry
 Princess Margriet: Grand Cross of the Order of Christ
 Pieter van Vollenhoven: Grand Cross of the Order of Prince Henry

Romania 
 Princess Beatrix of the Netherlands : 
  Socialist Republic of Romania: Grand Cross of the Order of 23 August
 : Collar of the Order of the Star of Romania (2001)
 Princess Margriet of the Netherlands :
  Socialist Republic of Romania: Grand Cross of the Order of 23 August
 Pieter van Vollenhoven :
  Socialist Republic of Romania: Grand Cross of the Order of 23 August

Slovakia
 King Willem-Alexander: Grand Cross of the Order of the White Double Cross (7 March 2023)
 Queen Maxima: Grand Cross of the Order of the White Double Cross (7 March 2023)
 Princess Beatrix: Grand Cross of the Order of the White Double Cross

Spain
 King Willem-Alexander: Knight Grand Cross of the Order of Isabella the Catholic (2001) 
 Queen Maxima: Dame Grand Cross of the Order of Isabella the Catholic (2001) 
 Princess Beatrix:
 Dame of the Order of the Golden Fleece (1,187th member; 1985)
 Dame Grand Cross of the Order of Isabella the Catholic (1980)
 Princess Margriet: Dame Grand Cross of the Order of Isabella the Catholic (1980)
 Pieter van Vollenhoven: Knight Grand Cross of the Order of Isabella the Catholic (1980)

Sweden

 King Willem-Alexander: Knight with Collar of the Royal Order of the Seraphim
 Queen Maxima: 
 Commander Grand Cross of the Order of the Polar Star (21 April 2009)
 Member of the Royal Order of the Seraphim (11 October 2022)
 Princess Beatrix: Member with Collar of the Royal Order of the Seraphim
 Recipient of the 50th Birthday Badge Medal of King Carl XVI Gustaf (30/04/1996)
 Recipient of the 70th Birthday Badge Medal of King Carl XVI Gustaf (30/04/2016)
 Princess Margriet: Commander Grand Cross of the Order of the Polar Star
 Pieter van Vollenhoven: Commander Grand Cross of the Order of the Polar Star

Turkey
 Princess Beatrix: Member 1st Class of the Order of the State of Republic of Turkey

United Kingdom
 King Willem-Alexander: Stranger Knight of the Order of the Garter (2018)
 Princess Beatrix:
 Stranger Lady of the Order of the Garter (8th Lady since 1901; 1989)
 Recipient of the Royal Victorian Chain (1982)
 Honorary Dame Grand Cross of the Royal Victorian Order (1958)

Yugoslavia
 Princess Beatrix: Grand Cross of the Order of the Yugoslav Star

African foreign honours

Cameroon 
 Princess Margriet of the Netherlands : Grand Cordon of Order of Merit
 Pieter van Vollenhoven : Grand Cordon of Order of Merit

Cape Verde 
 King Willem-Alexander of the Netherlands : Member 1st Class of the Amílcar Cabral Order
 Queen Máxima of the Netherlands : Medal of Merit, 1st Class

Ethiopia 
 Princess Beatrix of the Netherlands : Grand Cross of the Order of the Queen of Sheba (1969)

Ghana 
 Princess Beatrix of the Netherlands : Honorary Companion of the Order of the Star of Ghana

Ivory Coast 

 Princess Beatrix of the Netherlands : Grand Cross of the National Order (January 1973)
 Princess Margriet of the Netherlands : Grand Cross of the National Order
 Pieter van Vollenhoven : Grand Cross of the National Order

Liberia 
 Princess Beatrix of the Netherlands : Grand Cordon of the Order of the Pioneers of Liberia

Senegal 

 Princess Beatrix of the Netherlands : Grand Cross of the National Order of the Lion
 Princess Margriet of the Netherlands : Grand Cross of the National Order of the Lion
 Pieter van Vollenhoven : Grand Cross of the National Order of the Lion

South Africa
 Princess Beatrix: Grand Cross of the Order of Good Hope

Tunisia 
 Princess Beatrix of the Netherlands : Grand Cordon of the Order of the Republic (1973)

Asian foreign honours

Brunei 
 King Willem-Alexander of the Netherlands : Member of the Family Order of Laila Utama (prefix: Datu Laila Utama, post-nominal: DK, 21 January 2013)
 Queen Queen Máxima of the Netherlands : Member of the Family Order of Laila Utama (prefix: Datu Laila Utama, post-nominal: DK, 21 January 2013)
 Princess Beatrix of the Netherlands (when Queen) : Member of the Royal Family Order of the Crown of Brunei (post-nominal: DKMB, 21 January 2013)

Indonesia 
 King Willem-Alexander of the Netherlands:Star of Mahaputera, 1st Class (27 August 1995)
 Princess Beatrix of the Netherlands: Star of the Republic of Indonesia, 1st Class (27 August 1995)

Iranian Imperial Family
 Princess Beatrix: Member 1st Class of the Order of the Pleiades
 Princess Irene: Member 2nd Class of the Order of the Pleiades

Japan

 King Willem-Alexander: Grand Cordon with Collar of the Order of the Chrysanthemum
 Queen Maxima: Grand Cordon (Paulownia) of the Order of the Precious Crown
 Princess Beatrix: 
 Grand Cordon with Collar of the Order of the Chrysanthemum
 Grand Cordon (Paulownia) of the Order of the Precious Crown
 Princess Margriet: Grand Cordon (Paulownia) of the Order of the Precious Crown
 Pieter van Vollenhoven: Grand Cordon of the Order of the Sacred Treasure

Jordan 
 Princess Beatrix: Collar of the Order of al-Hussein bin Ali
 Prince Constantjin: Grand Cordon of the Supreme Order of the Renaissance
 Princess Laurentien: Grand Cordon of the Supreme Order of the Renaissance
 Princess Margriet: Grand Cordon of the Supreme Order of the Renaissance
 Pieter van Vollenhoven: Grand Cordon of the Supreme Order of the Renaissance

Nepalese Royal Family
 Princess Beatrix: Member of the Order of Ojaswi Rajanya

Oman 
 King Willem-Alexander of the Netherlands : Supreme Class of the Order of the Renaissance of Oman (10 January 2012)
 Queen Máxima of the Netherlands : Member First Class of the Order of Sultan Qaboos (10 January 2012)
 Princess Beatrix of the Netherlands : Member of the Order of Al-Said (10 January 2012)

Qatar 
 Princess Beatrix of the Netherlands : The Necklace of Independence (9 March 2011)

Thailand
 King Willem-Alexander: Knight Grand Cross of the Order of Chula Chom Klao
 Princess Princess Beatrix:
 Dame of the Order of the Rajamitrabhorn
 Dame of the Order of the Royal House of Chakri
 Princess Irene: Dame Grand Cross of the Order of Chula Chom Klao

United Arab Emirates 
 King Willem-Alexander of the Netherlands : Member of the Union Order (9 January 2012)
 Queen Máxima of the Netherlands : Member of the Union Order (9 January 2012)
 Princess Beatrix of the Netherlands : Member of the Order of Zayed (9 January 2012)

North American foreign honours

Mexico 
 King Willem-Alexander of the Netherlands : Sash of the Order of the Aztec Eagle (2 November 2009)
 Queen Máxima of the Netherlands : Sash of the Order of the Aztec Eagle (2 November 2009)
 Princess Beatrix of the Netherlands : Collar of the Order of the Aztec Eagle (2 November 2009)
 Princess Margriet of the Netherlands : Sash of the Order of the Aztec Eagle
 Princess Irene of the Netherlands : Sash of the Order of the Aztec Eagle

South American foreign honours

Argentina 
 King Willem-Alexander of the Netherlands : Collar of the Order of the Liberator General San Martín (27/03/2017)

Brazil 
 King Willem-Alexander of the Netherlands : Grand Cross of the Order of the Southern Cross (2003)
 Queen Máxima of the Netherlands : Grand Cross of the Order of the Southern Cross (2003)
 Princess Beatrix of the Netherlands : Grand Collar of the Order of the Southern Cross (2003)

Chile 

 King Willem-Alexander of the Netherlands : Grand Cross of the Order of Merit (2003)
 Queen Máxima of the Netherlands : Grand Cross of the Order of Merit (2003)
 Princess Beatrix of the Netherlands : Collar of the Order of Merit (2003)
 Princess Margriet of the Netherlands : Grand Cross of the Order of Merit (25/05/2009)

Peru 
 Princess Beatrix of the Netherlands : Grand Cross of the Order of the Sun (1997)
 Princess Irene of the Netherlands : Grand Cross of the Order of the Sun

Suriname 

 Princess Beatrix of the Netherlands : Grand Cordon of the Honorary Order of the Yellow Star
 Princess Margriet of the Netherlands : Grand Cordon of the Honorary Order of the Yellow Star
 Pieter van Vollenhoven : Grand Cordon of the Honorary Order of the Yellow Star

Venezuela 

 King Willem-Alexander of the Netherlands : Grand Cordon of the Order of the Liberator (2006)
 Princess Beatrix of the Netherlands : Collar of the Order of the Liberator (1987)
 Princess Margriet of the Netherlands : Grand Cordon of the Order of the Liberator
 Pieter van Vollenhoven : Grand Cordon of the Order of the Liberator

References

Sources 
 ALLESOPEENRIJ, Onderscheidingen van de koninklijke familie (Decorations of the Royal Family)

 
Dutch